The Livermore Time Sharing System (LTSS) was a supercomputer operating system originally developed by the Lawrence Livermore Laboratories for the Control Data Corporation 6600 and 7600 series of supercomputers in 1965.  

LTSS resulted in the Cray Time Sharing System and then the Network Livermore Timesharing System (NLTSS).

See also
UNICOS

References

Discontinued operating systems
Time-sharing operating systems
Supercomputer operating systems